Relph is an English surname. It is a variant of the surname Relf, which stems from the old French given name Riulf. The name was derived from Germanic words ric (power) and wulf (wolf). Notable people with the surname include:

Edward Relph, Canadian geographer 
Emma Relph, British actress
George Relph (1888–1960), English actor 
Little Tich (born Harry Relph; 1867–1928), English music hall comedian
Jerry Relph (1944-2020), American politician
Joseph Relph (1712–1743), English poet
Michael Relph (1915–2004), English film producer and director
Nick Relph (born 1979), British artist-filmmaker 
Pam Relph (born 1989), British Paralympic rower
Simon Relph (1940–2016), British film producer and director
Tyler Relph (born 1984), American basketball trainer and former player
William Relph (1900–1978), English football forward

References